James H. Ostrander was a farmer from Waterloo, Wisconsin who served a single term as a member of the Wisconsin State Assembly from a Jefferson County district comprising the Towns of Waterloo, Milford, Lake Mills and Oakland.

Early years in Wisconsin 
Ostrander came to what was then Aztalan township in the Wisconsin Territory in 1842, settling in Section 18. He helped organize Waterloo as a separate town in 1845 or 1846, and served as its first superintendent of schools.

Legislative service 
At the time of his service in the Assembly, he was 55 years old, a native of New York state and had been in Wisconsin for 10 years. He was assigned to the standing committee on internal improvements. He was a Whig.

It is unclear what his relationship is to James W. Ostrander or to Jared F. Ostrander, who both also served in the Assembly from Jefferson County.

References 

Members of the Wisconsin State Assembly
People from Waterloo, Wisconsin
People from New York (state)
Wisconsin Whigs
Farmers from Wisconsin
School superintendents in Wisconsin